This is a list of the mammal species recorded in Kiribati, a sovereign state in the central Pacific Ocean. There are thirteen mammal species around Kiribati, all of which are marine mammals in the order Cetacea. None are thought to be at risk, but some have insufficient data collected on them to allow an assessment to be made.

The marine mammals of the order Cetacea that have been identified in the Pacific is described in the literature review by Miller (2006) and by the Secretariat of the Pacific Regional Environment Programme (SPREP). A revision of the list of cetaceans reported in the ocean surrounding the islands of Kiribati was carried by Miller (2009).

In 2010 a research voyage was conducted within the exclusive economic zones (EEZ) of Kiribati and Tuvalu. The survey confirmed the presence of seven species of cetaceans: Bryde's, sperm, killer, shortfinned pilot and false killer whales and spinner and striped dolphins.

The following tags are used to highlight each species' conservation status as assessed by the International Union for Conservation of Nature:

Order: Cetacea (whales) 

The order Cetacea includes whales, dolphins and porpoises. They are the mammals most fully adapted to aquatic life with a spindle-shaped nearly hairless body, protected by a thick layer of blubber, and forelimbs and tail modified to provide propulsion underwater.

Lack of studies and dedicated observation efforts result in poor understanding of cetacean diversity in the region.

Suborder: Mysticeti
Family: Balaenidae
Genus: Eubalaena
 Southern right whale, Eubalaena australis LR/cd
Suborder: Odontoceti
Family: Physeteridae
Genus: Physeter
 Sperm whale, Physeter macrocephalus VU
Superfamily: Platanistoidea
Family: Kogiidae
Genus: Kogia
 Dwarf sperm whale, Kogia sima LR/lc
Family: Ziphidae
Subfamily: Hyperoodontinae
Genus: Hyperoodon
 Southern bottlenose whale, Hyperoodon planifrons LR/cd
Genus: Mesoplodon
 Blainville's beaked whale, Mesoplodon densirostris DD
 Ginkgo-toothed beaked whale, Mesoplodon ginkgodens DD
 Deraniyagala's beaked whale, Mesoplodon hotaula DD
Family: Delphinidae (marine dolphins)
Genus: Steno
 Rough-toothed dolphin, Steno bredanensis DD
Genus: Stenella
 Spinner dolphin, Stenella longirostris LR/cd
Genus: Lagenodelphis
 Fraser's dolphin, Lagenodelphis hosei DD
Genus: Globicephala
 Short-finned pilot whale, Globicephala macrorhynchus LR/cd
Genus: Feresa
 Pygmy killer whale, Feresa attenuata DD
Genus: Orcinus
 Orca, Orcinus orca LR/cd

Notes

References

See also
List of chordate orders
Lists of mammals by region
List of prehistoric mammals
Mammal classification
List of mammals described in the 2000s
Pacific Islands Cetaceans Memorandum of Understanding

Kiribati
Mammals
Mammals
Kiribati